Eugene G. Kubina (born April 4, 1948) is a former member of the Alaska House of Representatives, American educator, and businessman.

Born in Warren, Ohio, Kubina graduated from Pacific High School in San Bernardino, California. Kubina went to San Bernardino Valley College. He then received his bachelor's degree from San Diego State University in 1974 and his master's degree in school administration from the University of Hawaii in 1984. Kubima moved to Shishmaref, Alaska and then settled in Valdez, Alaska in 1978. He was a teacher and businessman. From 1966 to 1968, Kubina served in the United States Army. From 1989 to 1998, Kubina served in the Alaska House of Representatives and was a Democrat.

Notes

1948 births
Living people
People from Valdez, Alaska
Politicians from Warren, Ohio
San Diego State University alumni
University of Hawaiʻi at Mānoa alumni
Businesspeople from Alaska
Educators from Alaska
Democratic Party members of the Alaska House of Representatives
Educators from Ohio